Trevor Sackville Anthony Haynes (born 17 November 1929) is a former long-distance runner. He competed in the marathon at the 1964 Summer Olympics representing Northern Rhodesia. He carried the Northern Rhodesian flag at the Tokyo Olympics Opening Ceremony, but as Zambia declared its independence on 24 October 1964, Haynes carried the Zambian flag at the Closing Ceremony.

References

External links
 

1929 births
Possibly living people
Northern Rhodesia people
Athletes (track and field) at the 1964 Summer Olympics
Zambian male long-distance runners
Zambian male marathon runners
Olympic athletes of Northern Rhodesia
People from Kabwe District